Gabriela Arroyo (born 9 January 1957 in Buenos Aires) is a former member of the Workers' Party of Argentina (Partido Obrero).

She was its candidate for vice-president of Argentina in the 2007 Argentine general election.

External links
article announcing her candidacy (in Spanish)

Living people
Workers' Party (Argentina) politicians
Politicians from Buenos Aires
1957 births
21st-century Argentine women politicians
21st-century Argentine politicians